Sweffling is a village and a civil parish in the East Suffolk district, in the county of Suffolk, England. Nearby settlements include the town of Saxmundham and the village of Rendham.

The medieval church of St Mary the Virgin, restored in 1832, is a grade II* listed building.

References 

Villages in Suffolk
Civil parishes in Suffolk
Suffolk Coastal